Manchester is a city in Northwest England.  The M18 postcode area is to the southeast of the city centre, and contains the area of Gorton.  The postcode area contains 14 listed buildings that are recorded in the National Heritage List for England.  Of these, three are listed at Grade II*, the middle grade of the three grades, and the others are at Grade II, the lowest grade.  The area is now mainly residential, and the listed buildings include houses, churches, a mausoleum, a public house, a war memorial, and a former school.


Key

Buildings

References

Citations

Sources

Lists of listed buildings in Greater Manchester
Buildings and structures in Manchester